Pratylenchus neglectus is a plant-pathogenic nematode infecting potato, alfalfa and mint.

References

External links 
 Pratylenchus neglectus. Nemaplex. University of California, Davis.

neglectus
Plant pathogenic nematodes
Potato diseases
Nematodes described in 1941